Lithuanian Argentines are Argentine citizens who are fully, partially, or predominantly of Lithuanian descent, or Lithuanian-born people residing in Argentina. During the 1920s about 35,000 Lithuanians arrived in Argentina.

History

Pioneers and settlements 

In 1909, a group of Lithuanian immigrants from the cities of Ensenada and Berisso founded the Lithuanian Mutual Aid Society Vargdienis, whose prominent members were the Lithuanian gentlemen Rimavičius, Pavilonis, Bogužas and Baltušis. With less specific dates it is known that even before the First World War there had been organisations of Lithuanian immigrants in Villa Diego, near Rosario, Santa Fe (Aušros žvaigždė) and in the city of Avellaneda (Susivienijimas lietuvių Argentinoje). The collectivity of Berisso meanwhile adopted the name of Nemunas, which retains to the present. The Lithuanian diaspora in Argentina have their own radio programme called "Echoes of Lithuania" (Ecos de Lituania).

There is also a significant Lithuanian-Jewish community.

Organisations 
They established their own institutions: Sociedad Lituana de Socorros Mutuos Vargdienis (established 1909), Aušros žvaigždė, Susivienijimas lietuvių Argentinoje, Nemunas.

Notable Lithuanian Argentines 
 Héctor Adomaitis, football player
 José Alperovich, politician
 Rimas Álvarez Kairelis, rugby union player
 Ricardo Ivoskus, lawyer and politician
 Liudas Jakavicius-Grimalauskas, pianist
 Julieta Jankunas, field hockey player
 Joseph Kessel, journalist
 Antonio Krapovickas, botanist
 Fanny Mikey, actress and theatre producer
 Gustavo Majauskas, Olympic weightlifter

See also

Lithuanian Brazilians
Estonian Argentines

References

 
Argentina
European Argentine
Argentina